Thomas Bray (1656 or 165815 February 1730) was an English clergyman and abolitionist who helped formally establish the Church of England in Maryland, as well as the Society for the Propagation of Christian Knowledge and Society for the Propagation of the Gospel in Foreign Parts.

Life

Early life
Thomas Bray was born in Marton, then in the parish of Chirbury, Shropshire, at a house today called Bray's Tenement, on Marton Crest, in 1656 or 1658. He was educated at Oswestry School and Oxford University, where he earned a B.A. degree with All Souls College in 1678 and a M.A. with Hart Hall in 1693. He also completed the work for B.D. and D.D. degrees at Oxford (Magdalen, 17 Dec. 1696) at the request of Maryland's governor, but was unable to pay the required fees.

Ministry
After graduation and ordination, Bray returned to the Midlands as a curate at Bridgnorth and then became chaplain to the family of Sir Thomas Price in Warwickshire. Price also gave Thomas Bray a position at Lea Marston, where his diligence and library drew the attention of a neighboring vicar, John Kettlewell at Coleshill. Kettlewell pointed out to Bray that the poverty of country parsons kept them from owning and reading theological books, which could lead to ignorance and hopelessness and affect their ministry. Kettlewell also introduced him to Sir Charles Holt and to Lord Digby whose brother made Thomas vicar of Over Whitacre, and in 1690 rector of St Giles' Church, Sheldon. In addition to his parish duties at Shelden, Bray also wrote the first volume of what he intended to be a four-volume set of Catechetical Lectures, and published the first volume, dedicating it to William Lloyd, Bishop of Lichfield.

The book sold well and drew the attention of Henry Compton, Bishop of London. In 1696, Bishop Compton appointed Mr Bray as his commissary to organize the Church of England in the Colony of Maryland. Protestant rebels had ousted the Catholic Proprietor, Lord Baltimore in the colony's revolution, and in 1689 (the year after the Glorious Revolution in Britain), the British Crown ousted the proprietor's governor and took title to the restive Colony. Maryland already had numerous Church of England parishes, and had requested an "experienced, unexceptionable priest" to supervise them. However, such organization needed royal authorization, as well as additional priests. Mr Bray knew that the clergy willing to accept positions overseas were often among the poorest, unable to bring or obtain religious books, so he conditioned his acceptance upon having funds to supply the parishes with books, which educational mission was soon expanded to deaneries in England and Wales as the Society for Promoting Christian Knowledge (founded March 1698). Meanwhile, Lord Baltimore's heir, Benedict then a devout Catholic, had fled to France, but in 1698 received a royal licence to return to England, where he soon married.

Due to England vetoing the establishment for a commissary, Bray's trip to Maryland was delayed prompting a "resubmission of the act for His Majesty's assent". In 1699 Thomas Bray sailed to Maryland, along with two recruited priests. He had started his library work by establishing seaport libraries at Gravesend, Deal, and Plymouth on his outward journey. By the time Bray left Maryland the following year, he had divided the colony's ten counties into thirty parishes, as well as established seventeen parish libraries there—the one in the colonial capital at Annapolis in part using four hundred silver pounds contributed by Princess Anne of Denmark (of £1500 pledged by wealthy subscribers, including two archbishops and five bishops). Bray took a great interest in colonial missions, especially among the slaves and Native Americans, writing and preaching vigorously against slavery and the oppression of Indians. Bray left swiftly after securing the establishment of the Church of England in the colony pursuant to an Act of the Assembly in 1700, because the colony's Quakers had lobbyists in England attempting to secure the law's veto, as had happened twice before.

Upon returning to England, in 1701 Bray published an expanded edition of his Catechesis, as well as a report on the Church of England in North America, which refuted the Quaker arguments against the church's establishment in the colony. Rev. Bray did not, however, manage to get a bishop authorized for the colony. He also helped secure a royal charter for the Society for the Propagation of the Gospel in Foreign Parts, now known as USPG in June 1701.

His scheme for establishing parish libraries in England and America, succeeded: with 80 established in England and Wales during his lifetime (as well as a 1709 royal act securing the preservation of English parish libraries) and another 39 in the Colonies. Bray envisioned a library for each parish in America: 
 
These libraries were meant to encourage the spread of the Anglican church in Britain's colonies, and as such mostly included theological works. It was a major endeavor, as at the time the only other public libraries in the American colonies were at a small number of universities. Bray's efforts would eventually lead to the founding of almost 100 libraries in America and more than 200 libraries in England.

In 1706, Bray accepted the position as rector of St Botolph's, Aldgate, a position which he had refused before his Maryland voyage. He spent the final decades of his life serving that London parish, as well as engaging in other philanthropic and literary activities, until his death in February 1730. Visitors were especially impressed by his catechising of charity children well into his own old age, as well as work on behalf of prisoners at Newgate prison, including weekly "beef and beer" dinners and proposals for prison reform. His last publication was a memoir of John Rawlet of Newcastle, another friend of John Kettlewell.

In 1723, Bray became seriously ill, and worried that his evangelistic work in rural deaneries and among Africans and Native Americans might lapse. He formed a group of 'associates' to succeed him. Known collectively as Doctor Bray's Associates, the group received a chancery charter shortly after his death, and continues to publish an annual report of their activities.

Death
Thomas Bray died on 15 February 1730 and was buried two days later in the churchyard at St. Botolph's.

Legacy
St Botolph's eventually erected a memorial plaque in his honor. In 1901, a memorial plaque was erected in the parish church at Chirbury. A contemporary described him as "a Great Small Man." Rev. Bray's concern for poor debtors and plan to allow them to emigrate overseas to better themselves drew the interest of General James Oglethorpe who received a royal charter to establish a colony in Georgia two years after Bray's death. The Episcopal Church, which received 50 libraries from Bray's society (17 in Maryland, mostly in what later became the Episcopal Diocese of Easton), remembers Rev. Thomas Bray with a feast day on its liturgical calendar on the anniversary of his death, 15 February. The Special Collections division of the University of Maryland has much of his correspondence with Maryland officials. The Diocese of Easton named its headquarters building to honor Bray.

Bray has been referred to as the Father of the Modern Lending Library. It is as a direct result of his efforts that a great deal of reading material was capable of flowing into the American colonies.  

Bray's work in America is currently recognized as the first major coordinated effort to establish libraries in the New World.

There has been at least some discussion as to the longevity of the library legacy that Bray left behind when he passed away. From the time of his death all the way up until the American Revolution, only four new libraries were founded in the American Colonies. It also seems that few additions were being made to the libraries already founded during his life. This seems to indicate that while Bray was an arbitrator of great good to the American colonies for a time, that his libraries failed to endure as time went on.

The Society for the Propagation of the Gospel persisted in its work even after the passing of its founder. The society managed to send out Books, pamphlets, and other reading material in order to aid missionaries in the colonies. The work of the Society continued in America up until the end of the Revolutionary War, with correspondence requesting books from the Society as late as 1771 in North Carolina. The Society also perpetuated Bray's aspirations for a ministry to the mistreated Native America and African peoples within the American colonies. Correspondence between the Society and a missionary named Alexander Stuart clearly shows the Society's hand in the education of both African and Native American peoples during the 18th century.

Thomas is remembered in the Church of England with a commemoration and honored with a feast on the Episcopal Church calendar on 15 February.

Family
Rev. Bray had a wife and two children by the time he accepted the position at St. Botolph's.

See also
 Society for the Propagation of the Gospel in Foreign Parts
 Society for the Propagation of Christian Knowledge

References

Notes

Citations

Sources

Further reading

External links
With the Saints in Lent (3): Thomas Bray, 15 February by Patrick Comerford, lecturer in Anglicanism and Liturgy, the Church of Ireland Theological Institute, and an adjunct assistant professor at the University of Dublin (Trinity College Dublin).

1658 births
1730 deaths
17th-century English Anglican priests
18th-century English Anglican priests
Alumni of Hart Hall, Oxford
Anglican saints
Fellows of All Souls College, Oxford
English emigrants
Libraries in British North America
People educated at Oswestry School
Clergy from Shropshire
People of colonial Maryland